Luana may refer to:

 Luana, Iowa, a town in the United States
 Luana, an Italian singer-songwriter, co-founder of Belladonna
 Countess Luana of Orange-Nassau, Jonkvrouwe van Amsberg, member of the Dutch royal family
 Luana the Jungle Girl a.k.a. Luana, the Girl Tarzan (1968), Italian-German film with Mei Chen as Luana, a jungle girl
 Luana/Susan Wilson from Daughter of the Jungle (1982), Italian film with Sabrina Siani as Luana/Susan Wilson
 Luana, by Alan Dean Foster, a 1974 novel based on a film
 Luana Bertolucci Paixão, a Brazilian football player
 Luana (given name)

Feminine given names
Romanian feminine given names